This is a list of airports in the Republic of Korea (South Korea), grouped by type and sorted by location.

See also 
 Transportation in South Korea
 Wikipedia: Airline destination lists: Asia
 List of busiest airports in South Korea by passenger traffic

References

External links 
 Lists of airports in South Korea:
 Great Circle Mapper
 FallingRain.com
 Aircraft Charter World
 The Airport Guide
 World Aero Data
 A-Z World Airports

South Korea
 
Airports
Airports
South Korea